Crocanthes micradelpha is a species of moth of the family Lecithoceridae. It is found in the northern parts of Queensland in Australia.

The forewings are orange-yellow with a small blackish spot on the costa at one-third from the base and a broad, purplish-fuscous, hindmarginal band, occupying one-third of the wing, the anterior edge darker, and slightly curved outwards. There is a yellowish, elongate spot on the costal portion of the band. The hindwings are dark-fuscous.

C. micradelpha lays flat eggs.  The larvae that hatch from them are white, and hairy, feeding on eucalypt leaf litter.

References

Crocanthes
Moths of Australia
Moths described in 1897